Argo Records was a record label in Chicago that was established in 1955 as a division of Chess Records.

Originally the label was called Marterry, but bandleader Ralph Marterie objected, and within a couple of months the imprint was renamed Argo.

Although Chess was a blues label, the Argo division began to record jazz in 1955 and over decades attracted some big names: Gene Ammons, Kenny Burrell, Barry Harris, Illinois Jacquet, Ahmad Jamal, Ramsey Lewis, James Moody, Max Roach, Red Rodney, and Ira Sullivan.

Argo also recorded pop, blues, and calypso. Its first big hit was by Clarence "Frogman" Henry, whose song "Ain't Got No Home" came out in 1956. By 1960, rhythm and blues performers on the label included Etta James and the Dells.

Argo changed its name in 1965 to Cadet Records when the company discovered that an Argo Records already existed in the UK. As with its parent label and British Argo, the catalog is owned by Universal Music Group. Argo was one of several record labels to lose master recordings in the 2008 Universal fire.

Discography

Jazz Series (1956-1965)

Pop/Blues/Folk Series (1961-1965)

See also 
 List of record labels

References

External links
 Argo discography

American record labels
Defunct record labels of the United States
Jazz record labels
Record labels established in 1956
Record labels disestablished in 1965
Chess Records